Orthopus is an extinct genus of non-mammalian synapsids. It is based on a partial humerus that closely resembles Estemmenosuchus, in the limited comparisons possible.

See also 

 List of therapsids

References 

 The main groups of non-mammalian synapsids at Mikko's Phylogeny Archive

Prehistoric synapsid genera
Permian animals of Europe
Permian animals of Asia
Fossil taxa described in 1838